Riptide is an American detective television series that ran on NBC from January 3, 1984 to April 22, 1986, starring Perry King, Joe Penny, and Thom Bray.

The series was created by Frank Lupo and Stephen J. Cannell, and produced by Stephen J. Cannell Productions in association with Columbia Pictures Television for NBC.  The main theme was composed by Mike Post and Pete Carpenter.  A mid-season replacement, it debuted as a two-hour TV movie in early 1984. After its cancellation, reruns were aired on the USA Network during the late 1980s. The series currently appears occasionally on the schedules of getTV and Decades.

Premise
Cody Allen (Perry King) and Nick Ryder (Joe Penny) are two former Army buddies who decided to open the Pier 56 Detective Agency (later known as the Riptide Detective Agency) in Los Angeles, California. Realizing that computers and technology play a major role in many investigations, they recruit the help of Murray "Boz" Bozinsky (Thom Bray), a brilliant but nerdy scientist and computer hacker whom they met while serving in the Army.

The team operate out of Cody's boat, the Riptide, moored at Pier 56 at King Harbor Marina in Redondo Beach.  The men have several other tools in their fight against crime and injustice.  These included Murray's robot, The Roboz (which, unlike most television robots, does not speak); Nick's aging Sikorsky S-58T helicopter, The Screaming Mimi, which Nick occasionally used for his sideline business, aerial harbor tours; and Cody's speedboat, the Ebb Tide.  Nick also owns a classic red Chevrolet Corvette and in early episodes Cody drives an orange "Woodie" station wagon which is later replaced by a four-wheel drive custom GMC Jimmy.

Lt. Quinlan (Jack Ging) is a local police officer who continually harasses the trio. Lt. Parisi (June Chadwick), the agency's police contact during the final episodes, is more cooperative. During the first few episodes, Mama Jo (Anne Francis) is the crusty skipper of the Barefoot Contessa, a tourist boat with an all-female crew. Introduced later in the first season is Max, a comedian at a local club. Second season episodes also feature Dooley (Ken Olandt), a dock boy who occasionally assists the team in their escapades.

The show's penultimate episode, "If You Can't Beat 'Em, Join 'Em", shows Cody and Nick acting as consultants to "Rosalind Grant" (Annette McCarthy) and "Cary Russell" (H. Richard Greene), the bickering stars of a television detective show pilot that closely resembles and parodies Moonlighting, Riptides former prime time competition on Tuesday nights.

Although local mobsters were depicted in most episodes, some reflected sensitive topics, like corruption within the U.S. Army, high-level cover-ups, and black ops by corporate America. The third season's "Home for Christmas", with a performance by James Whitmore, has a strongly emotional tone.

Cast
 Perry King as Cody Allen
 Joe Penny as Nick Ryder
 Thom Bray as Murray "Boz" Bozinsky

Episodes

Series overview

Season 1 (1984)

Season 2 (1984–85)

Season 3 (1985–86)

Home media

United States
Sony Pictures Home Entertainment released a three-disc DVD set of Riptide: The Complete First Season on February 14, 2006, available in the United States only.  Although the Sony release includes all of the episodes from the season, many of the opening teasers are missing.

Canada
Visual Entertainment has released all three seasons of Riptide, available in Canada only. Unlike the U.S. release, all of the opening teasers are intact. However, several episodes have music replaced and sequences edited out due to copyright issues. On October 14, 2008, VEI released Riptide: The Complete Series, a 13-disc box set featuring all 58 episodes of the show.  The release was initially scheduled to be released on September 9, 2008, but was delayed for unknown reasons.  As of 2013, these releases have been discontinued and are out of print.

Germany
In Germany the show is known under the title Trio mit vier Fäusten (Trio with Four Fists).

Universum Films has released all three seasons of Riptide for Germany on May 29, 2009 (Season 1), July 31, 2009 (Season 2) and September 25, 2009 (Season 3).

The DVD sets feature 4:3 Pal, DD 2.0 mono German and English, no teasers, but with a bonus episode of 21 Jump Street (Season 1). The Season 2 boxes will contain an episode not broadcast in Germany, "The Twisted Cross", in English with German subtitles. The German box sets have the original music of the U.S. series, unlike the Canadian box sets 2 and 3.

References

External links
 
 

1980s American crime drama television series
1984 American television series debuts
1986 American television series endings
American detective television series
NBC original programming
Television series by Stephen J. Cannell Productions
Television series by Sony Pictures Television
English-language television shows
Television shows set in Los Angeles
Television series created by Stephen J. Cannell
Television series created by Frank Lupo